Louise Elisabeth Pascal-de Graaff ( de Graaff; born 11 October 1946) is a retired Dutch rower. In the coxed fours, she won the European title in 1973 and finished fifth at the 1975 World Championships. She competed at the 1976 Summer Olympics in the coxed eights, together with Karin Abma, Joke Dierdorp, Barbara de Jong, Annette Schortinghuis-Poelenije, Marleen van Rij, Maria Kusters-ten Beitel, Loes Schutte and Evelien Koogje, and finished in eighth place.

References

 

1946 births
Living people
Dutch female rowers
Olympic rowers of the Netherlands
Rowers at the 1976 Summer Olympics
Sportspeople from Arnhem
European Rowing Championships medalists
21st-century Dutch women
20th-century Dutch women